Second Amendment sanctuary, also known as a gun sanctuary, refers to states, counties, or localities in the United States that have adopted laws or resolutions to prohibit or impede the enforcement of certain gun control measures which are perceived to violate the Second Amendment, such as universal gun background checks, high capacity magazine bans, assault weapon bans, red flag laws, etc. Although other jurisdictions had previously adopted legislation now characterized as creating Second Amendment sanctuaries, the Carroll County, Maryland Board of Commissioners is thought to be the first body to explicitly use the term "sanctuary" in its resolution on May 22, 2013 and Effingham County, Illinois County Board is thought to have to have popularized the term on April 16, 2018.

Examples of the resolutions include the Second Amendment Preservation Ordinance in Oregon and the Second Amendment Protection Act in Kansas. The term "sanctuary" draws its inspiration from the immigration sanctuary cities movement of jurisdictions that have resolved to not assist federal enforcement of immigration laws against illegal aliens.

State laws 
Although some of the state laws listed below were approved prior to the adoption of the term "sanctuary", they are now frequently characterized as part of the Second Amendment sanctuary movement. Montana was the first state to attempt passage of such bills in 2005, eventually passing in 2009, though it ended up being struck down by the Ninth Circuit Court of Appeals.

Alabama 
On April 13, 2022, Governor Kay Ivey signed the Alabama Second Amendment Preservation Act (SB 2). The full text may be read here.

Alaska 
On July 9, 2010, Governor Sean Parnell signed the Alaska Firearms Freedom Act (HB 186), declaring that certain firearms and accessories are exempt from federal regulation. The text can be read here. On September 10, 2013, Governor Parnell signed HB 69, which amended and expanded HB 186. The text can be read here.

Arizona 

On April 5, 2010, Governor Jan Brewer signed HB 2307 which exempted intrastate firearms from federal law. On April 6, 2021, Governor Doug Ducey signed the 2nd Amendment Firearm Freedom Act (HB 2111), which prohibits the state and all political subdivisions from assisting in the enforcement of federal firearm laws and regulations when they are inconsistent with state law.
	
On June 22, 2021, the city of Tucson passed a resolution to ignore the statewide Second Amendment sanctuary law.

Arkansas 
On April 26, 2021, Governor Asa Hutchinson vetoed SB298, The Arkansas Sovereignty Act Of 2021. The Senate promptly overrode the governor's veto later the same day. The House decided to postpone its veto override vote and instead, on April 27, passed HB1957, a less expansive version of the bill; the Senate then passed it as well shortly after midnight on April 28. The governor signed it on April 29, 2021.

Idaho 
On March 19, 2014, Governor Butch Otter signed SB 1332 to protect Idaho law enforcement officers from being directed by the federal government to violate citizens' rights under Section 11, Article I of the Idaho Constitution. The text can be read here. Previously, HJM 3 was passed in 2009. That text can be read here.

Kansas 
On April 16, 2013, Governor Sam Brownback signed the Second Amendment Protection Act. The text can be read here.

Missouri 
On June 12, 2021, Governor Mike Parson signed the Second Amendment Preservation Act (HB 85), which will "reject any attempt by the federal government to circumvent the fundamental right Missourians have to keep and bear arms to protect themselves and their property." A similar bill had been passed in 2013, but was vetoed; a veto override passed in the House but failed by 1 vote in the Senate.

Montana 
On February 18, 2021, Governor Greg Gianforte signed HB 0258 banning the enforcement of federal bans on firearms, magazines, or ammunition. The bill applies retroactively to Jan. 1, 2021. Previously, Montana had passed the Montana Firearms Freedom Act (HB 246) in 2009 which exempted from federal law firearms manufactured within the state and that remain in the state. The law was subsequently struck down by the Ninth Circuit Court of Appeals.

Nebraska 
On April 14, 2021, Governor Pete Ricketts signed a proclamation that designated Nebraska as a "Second Amendment Sanctuary State." This proclamation is merely symbolic and does not carry the weight of law.

New Hampshire 
On June 24, 2022, Governor Chris Sununu signed HB 1178, an act "prohibiting the state from enforcing any federal statute, regulation, or Presidential Executive Order that restricts or regulates the right of the people to keep and bear arms."

North Dakota 
On April 22, 2021, Governor Doug Burgum signed HB 1383, which limits enforcing or assisting in the enforcement of federal firearms laws enacted after January 1, 2021, that are more restrictive than state law. On April 26, 2021, Burgum also signed a proclamation which designated North Dakota as a "Second Amendment Sanctuary State."

Oklahoma 
On April 26, 2021, Governor Kevin Stitt signed the Second Amendment Sanctuary State Act (SB 631) which prevents the confiscation or surrender of firearms, gun accessories, or ammunition from law-abiding Oklahomans, protecting the right to keep and bear arms guaranteed by the United States Constitution. In May 2020, Oklahoma became the first and thus far only state to enact an anti-red flag law. The law specifically "prohibits the state or any city, county or political subdivision from enacting red flag laws."

South Carolina 
On May 17, 2021, Governor Henry McMaster signed H.3094, also known as the Open Carry With Training Act. Section 9 of H.3094 notes "the state of South Carolina and its political subdivisions cannot be compelled" to enforce federal laws that regulate an individual's right to carry concealable weapons openly or concealed. Any such law must first be evaluated by the Attorney General who shall issue a written opinion on if it can be enforced.

South Dakota 
On March 12, 2010, Governor Mike Rounds signed SB 89. However, Sanctuarycounties.com, a pro-sanctuary county website tracking the movement does not consider this a Second Amendment sanctuary law, claiming it is more geared towards protecting firearm and ammunition manufacturers within the state from federal regulation, rather than the Second Amendment rights of state citizens.

Tennessee 
On May 26, 2021, Governor Bill Lee signed the "Tennessee Second Amendment Sanctuary Act" (SB 1335) which prohibits Tennessee or any of its subdivisions from enforcing "any law, treaty, executive order, rule, or regulation of the United States government that violates the Second Amendment". Previously, the Tennessee Firearms Freedom Act was passed in 2009.

Texas 
On June 16, 2021, Governor Greg Abbott signed the Second Amendment Sanctuary Act (87(R) HB 2622). The Act went into effect September 1, 2021, and prohibits Texas agencies from assisting the federal government in enforcing federal gun-control laws passed after January 19, 2021. The text of the Act can be read here.

Utah 
On February 26, 2010, Governor Gary Herbert signed the Utah State-made Firearms Protection Act (SB 11). Like the South Dakota bill, Sanctuarycounties.com does not consider this a Second Amendment sanctuary law, claiming it's more focused towards protecting firearm and ammunition manufacturers within the state than the rights of state citizens.

West Virginia 
On April 27, 2021, Governor Jim Justice signed the Second Amendment Preservation and Anti-Federal Commandeering Act (HB 2694) which prohibits the federal commandeering of employees and agencies of the state for the purpose of enforcing federal firearms laws. HB 2694 also prohibits police departments and officers from executing red flag laws or federal search warrants on firearms, accessories, or ammunition of law abiding persons.

Wyoming 
On March 11, 2010, Governor Dave Freudenthal signed the Wyoming Firearms Freedom Act. The text can be read here.

Local laws

Arkansas
4 out of 75 counties have adopted Second Amendment sanctuary (or other pro-Second Amendment) resolutions:

Cleburne
Crawford
Independence
Scott

Arizona
5 out of 15 counties and 1 city have adopted Second Amendment sanctuary (or other pro-Second Amendment) resolutions:

Apache
La Paz
Maricopa
Mohave (plus Bullhead City)
Yavapai

California
1 out of 58 counties and 1 city have adopted Second Amendment sanctuary (or other pro-Second Amendment) resolutions:

Needles City
Siskiyou

Colorado
39 out of 64 counties, 3 cities, and 4 towns have adopted Second Amendment sanctuary (or other pro-Second Amendment) resolutions:

Alamosa
Archuleta
Baca
Bent

Cheyenne
Commerce City
Conejos

Crowley
Custer (plus Silver Cliff Town)
Delta
Dolores
Douglas
El Paso (plus Monument Town)
Elbert
Fremont (plus Cañon City)
Garfield

Huerfano
Jackson

Kiowa
Kit Carson

Las Animas
Lincoln
Logan
Mesa
Mineral
Moffat (plus Craig City)
Montezuma
Montrose
Morgan
Otero
Park
Phillips (plus Haxtun Town)
Prowers 

Rio Blanco
Rio Grande
Sedgwick
Teller
Washington
Weld (plus Milliken Town)
Yuma

Florida 
37 out of 67 counties, 3 cities, and 1 town have adopted Second Amendment sanctuary (or other pro-Second Amendment) resolutions.

In 2013, all 67 sheriffs in Florida had signed a letter saying that they will not enforce laws that violate the Constitution or infringe on the rights of the people to own firearms.

Bay (plus Panama City Beach City)
Bradford
Calhoun
Citrus
Clay
Collier (plus Marco Island City)
Columbia
DeSoto
Dixie
Escambia

Gilchrist
Gulf
Hendry
Hernando
Highlands

Holmes
Jackson
Jefferson
Lafayette
Lake
Lee
Levy (plus Bronson Town)
Madison
Marion
Nassau
Newberry City
Okaloosa
Okeechobee
Polk
Putnam
Santa Rosa
St. Johns
Sumter
Suwannee
Taylor
Union
Wakulla
Walton

Georgia 
23 out of 159 counties and 1 city have adopted Second Amendment sanctuary (or other pro-Second Amendment) resolutions:

Atkinson
Banks
Barrow

Bulloch

Coweta

Fannin
Floyd
Franklin
Gilmer

Habersham
Haralson

Hart (plus Hartwell City)
Jackson

McIntosh
Meriwether

Murray

Pike
Polk
Rabun
Spalding
Stephens

Walton

Whitfield

Illinois 
68 out of 102 counties, 2 cities, and 4 townships have adopted Second Amendment sanctuary (or other pro-Second Amendment) resolutions:

Adams
Bond
Boone
Brown
Bureau
Calhoun
Christian
Clark
Clay
Clinton
Coles
Crawford
Cumberland
Douglas
Edgar
Edwards
Effingham
Farmer City
Fayette
Ford
Franklin
Gallatin
Greene
Hamilton
Hancock
Hardin
Henderson
Henry
Iroquois
Jasper
Jefferson
Jersey
Johnson
LaSalle
Lawrence
Livingston
Logan
Macon
Macoupin
Madison
Marion
Massac
McDonough
McHenry Township
Mercer
Monroe
Montgomery (plus Hillsboro City)
Moultrie
Morgan
O'Fallon Township
Ogle 
Perry
Piatt
Pike
Plainfield Township
Pope
Pulaski
Randolph
Richland
Saline
Schuyler
Shelby
St. Clair Township
Stark
Tazewell
Union
Wabash

Washington
Wayne
White
Williamson
Woodford

Indiana 
9 out of 92 counties have adopted Second Amendment sanctuary (or other pro-Second Amendment) resolutions:

Cass
Crawford

Franklin
Gibson
Grant

Jennings

Morgan

Pike

Switzerland

Kansas 
1 out of 105 counties have adopted Second Amendment sanctuary (or other pro-Second Amendment) resolutions:

Cherokee

Kentucky 
115 out of 120 counties and 6 cities have adopted Second Amendment sanctuary (or other pro-Second Amendment) resolutions:

Adair
Allen
Anderson
Barren
Bath
Bell (plus Pineville City)
Boone
Bourbon
Boyd
Boyle
Bracken
Breathitt
Breckinridge
Bullitt (plus Mount Washington City and Shepherdsville City)
Butler
Caldwell
Calloway
Campbell
Carlisle
Carroll
Carter
Casey
Christian
Clark
Clay
Clinton
Crittenden
Cumberland
Daviess
Edmonson
Elliott
Estill
Floyd
Fleming
Franklin
Gallatin
Garrard
Grant
Graves
Grayson
Green
Greenup
Hancock
Harlan
Harrison
Hart
Henderson
Henry
Hickman
Hopkins
Jackson
Jessamine
Johnson
Kenton
Knott
Knox
LaRue
Laurel
Lawrence
Lee
Leslie
Letcher
Lewis
Lincoln (plus Crab Orchard City)
Livingston
Logan
Lyon
Madison
Magoffin
Marion
Marshall
Martin
Mason
McCreary
McLean
Meade
Menifee
Mercer (plus Burgin City and Harrodsburg City)
Metcalfe
Monroe
Montgomery
Morgan
Muhlenberg
Nelson
Nicholas
Ohio
Oldham
Owen
Owsley
Pendleton
Perry
Pike
Powell
Pulaski
Robertson
Rockcastle
Rowan
Russell
Scott
Shelby
Simpson
Spencer
Taylor
Todd
Trigg
Trimble
Union
Warren
Washington
Wayne
Webster
Whitley
Wolfe
Woodford

Maine 
0 out of 16 counties and 1 town have adopted Second Amendment sanctuary (or other pro-Second Amendment) resolutions:

Paris Town

Maryland 
4 out of 23 counties have adopted Second Amendment sanctuary (or other pro-Second Amendment) resolutions:
Allegany
Carroll
Cecil
Harford

Michigan 
51 out of 83 counties, 1 city, and 5 townships have adopted Second Amendment sanctuary (or other pro-Second Amendment) resolutions.
On February 25, 2020, the Michigan House of Representatives voted to reaffirm the Second Amendment. The text can be read here.

Alcona
Allegan
Alpena
Antrim
Arenac
Bay
Berrien
Branch
Cass
Charlevoix
Cheboygan
Chippewa
Clinton
Delta
Dickinson

Eaton
Emmet

Gladwin
Grand Traverse

Hillsdale

Huron
Ionia
Iosco
Iron
Jackson
Kalkaska
Lake
Lapeer

Livingston
Mackinac
Macomb

Marquette
Mason
Mecosta
Menominee
Missaukee
Monroe

Montmorency (plus Briley Township)

Oceana
Ogemaw
Osceola
Oscoda (plus Big Creek Township, Comins Township, and Greenwood Township)
Otsego
Presque Isle
Sanilac
Schoolcraft
Shiawassee
St. Clair
Stronach Township
Tuscola
Van Buren
Wexford (plus Manton City)

Minnesota 
17 out of 87 counties have adopted Second Amendment sanctuary (or other pro-Second Amendment) resolutions:

Becker

Clearwater
Chisago
Crow Wing
Faribault
Hubbard
Kanabec

Marshall
McLeod
Meeker
Mille Lacs

Pennington
Red Lake
Roseau

Todd
Wadena
Wright

Mississippi 
9 out of 82 counties have adopted Second Amendment sanctuary, safe haven, or other pro-Second Amendment resolutions:

Alcorn
DeSoto
Jackson
Lawrence
Lee
Lincoln
Madison

Tishomingo
Union

Nebraska 
4 out of 93 counties have adopted Second Amendment sanctuary (or other pro-Second Amendment) resolutions:

Cherry
Cheyenne
Morrill
Scotts Bluff

Nevada 
10 out of 16 counties have adopted Second Amendment sanctuary (or other pro-Second Amendment) resolutions.

All 17 sheriffs in Nevada (16 county and 1 Carson City) and have signed a letter expressing their support for the Second Amendment.

Douglas
Elko
Eureka
Humboldt
Lander
Lincoln
Lyon
Nye
Pershing
White Pine

New Jersey 
7 out of 21 counties, 25 townships, and 5 boroughs (30 of 565 total municipalities) have adopted Second Amendment sanctuary (or other pro-Second Amendment) resolutions:

Atlantic (plus Egg Harbor Township)
Cape May (plus Dennis Township, Lower Township, Middle Township, and Upper Township)
Commercial Township
Deerfield Township
Downe Township
Franklin Township (Gloucester County)
Lawrence Township (Cumberland County)
Maurice River Township
Monmouth (plus Howell Township)
Ocean (plus Berkeley Township and Little Egg Harbor Township)
Salem (plus Alloway Township, Lower Alloways Creek Township, Pennsville Township, and Upper Pittsgrove Township)
Stow Creek Township
Sussex (plus Branchville Borough, Franklin Borough, Hamburg Borough, Hopatcong Borough, Montague Township, Stillwater Township, and Sussex Borough)
Tabernacle Township
Warren (plus Oxford Township, Phillipsburg Town, and Washington Township)
West Milford Township

New Mexico 
26 out of 33 counties, 6 cities, and 1 town have adopted Second Amendment sanctuary (or other pro-Second Amendment) resolutions; Taos initially passed a resolution but later repealed it.

30 out of 33 county sheriffs have signed a letter by the New Mexico Sheriffs Association vowing to not assist in enforcing certain gun control.

Catron
Chaves (plus Roswell City)
Cibola
Colfax
Curry
De Baca
Eddy (plus Carlsbad City)
Grant
Harding
Hidalgo
Lea
Lincoln
Luna
McKinley
Mora
Otero (plus Alamogordo City)
Quay
Rio Arriba (plus Española City)
Roosevelt
San Juan (plus Bloomfield City, Farmington City, and Kirtland Town)
Sandoval
Sierra
Socorro
Torrance
Union
Valencia

New York 
The SAFE Act was passed in 2013. After passage, New York counties started passing resolutions opposing the SAFE Act. There are currently 52 out of 62 counties with such resolutions. The New York State Sheriffs Association sued to block the law.

1 out of 62 counties and 2 towns have adopted Second Amendment sanctuary (or other pro-Second Amendment) resolutions:

Broadalbin Town

Grand Island Town

Wyoming

North Carolina 
68 out of 100 counties, 1 city, and 2 towns have adopted Second Amendment sanctuary (or other pro-Second Amendment) resolutions:

Alamance
Alexander
Alleghany
Anson
Ashe
Avery
Beaufort

Bladen
Brunswick
Burke
Cabarrus
Caldwell
Camden
Carteret
Caswell
Catawba

Cherokee
Chowan
Clay
Cleveland
Columbus
Craven

Currituck
Dare
Davidson (plus Midway Town)
Davie

Forsyth
Franklin
Gaston
Gates
Graham
Granville

Harnett
Haywood
Henderson

Iredell

Johnston
Jones
Lee
Lenoir
Lincoln

Madison
Martin
McDowell

Mitchell
Montgomery
Moore

Onslow

Pamlico
Pasquotank

Person
Pitt
Polk
Randolph
Richmond
Robeson
Rockingham
Rowan (plus China Grove City)
Rutherford

Stanly
Stokes (plus King Town)
Surry

Union

Wayne
Wilkes
Wilson
Yadkin
Yancey

Ohio 
25 out of 88 counties and 3 township have adopted Second Amendment sanctuary (or other pro-Second Amendment) resolutions:

Adams

Brown
Clermont
Clinton
Coshocton

Gallia
Guernsey
Highland
Hocking
Huron
Jackson
Jackson Township (Perry County)
Knox
Lawrence
Licking

Marion

Meigs
Morgan (plus Deerfield Township)
Morrow
Muskingum
Pickaway
Pike
Preble
Seneca
Scioto

Vinton
Wheeling Township (Belmont County)

Oklahoma
26 out of 77 counties have adopted Second Amendment sanctuary (or other pro-Second Amendment) resolutions:

Atoka
Bryan
Caddo
Canadian
Carter
Choctaw
Cimarron
Coal
Cotton
Grady
Haskell
Johnston
Kiowa
Latimer
Le Flore
Lincoln
Logan
Major
Marshall
McCurtain
Osage
Ottawa
Pittsburg

Pushmataha
Rogers
Stephens

Oregon 
16 out of 36 counties and 1 city have adopted Second Amendment sanctuary (or other pro-Second Amendment) resolutions:

Baker
Clackamas
Columbia
Coos
Curry
Douglas
Grant
Harney

Josephine
Klamath
Lake
Linn 
Morrow (plus Lexington City)
Umatilla
Union
Wallowa
Wheeler

Pennsylvania 
3 out of 67 counties and 2 townships have adopted Second Amendment sanctuary (or other pro-Second Amendment) resolutions:

Bradford

Buffalo Township (Union County)

Cambria

Huntingdon

West Manheim Township

Rhode Island 
0 out of 8 cities and 10 out of 31 towns have adopted Second Amendment sanctuary (or other pro-Second Amendment) resolutions; while Rhode Island has 5 counties, there is no local government at that level.

Burrillville
Coventry
Foster
Glocester 
Hopkinton
Richmond
Scituate
Tiverton
West Greenwich
West Warwick

South Carolina 
3 out of 46 counties have adopted Second Amendment sanctuary (or other pro-Second Amendment) resolutions:

Cherokee

Kershaw
Pickens

Tennessee 
53 out of 95 counties, 1 city, and 1 town have adopted Second Amendment sanctuary (or other pro-Second Amendment) resolutions:

Anderson
Benton
Blount
Bradley
Cannon
Carter
Cheatham
Claiborne
Cocke

Cumberland
Dyer
Fayette
Fentress
Grainger
Greene
Grundy
Hamblen
Hancock
Hardin
Hawkins
Henderson
Henry
Hickman
Humphreys
Jefferson (plus Dandridge Town)
Johnson
Lake
Lewis

Loudon
Macon
Madison
Maury
McMinn
McNairy
Meigs
Monroe
Overton
Polk
Roane
Rutherford
Scott
Sequatchie
Sevier
Smith
Sullivan
Sumner
Unicoi
Van Buren
Warren
Washington
Wayne
White

Wilson (plus Mount Juliet City)

Texas 
77 out of 254 counties, 1 city, and 2 towns have adopted Second Amendment sanctuary (or other pro-Second Amendment) resolutions:

Anderson
Angelina
Atascosa
Bandera
Bowie
Brown
Calhoun
Callahan
Cass
Cherokee (plus Wells Town)
Chester Town
Clay
Coke
Coleman
Collin
Colorado
Cooke
Coryell
Dallam
Dawson
Denton
Eastland
Edwards
Ellis
Erath
Fannin
Freestone
Gonzales
Grimes
Hood
Hopkins
Houston
Howard (plus Big Spring City)
Hudspeth
Hunt
Hutchinson
Jack
Jackson

Johnson
Kaufman
Kinney
Knox
Lamar
Lavaca
Leon

Madison
Marion
McCulloch

Milam
Mitchell
Montgomery
Navarro
Nolan
Palo Pinto
Panola
Parker
Pecos
Presidio
Rains
Real
Red River

Rockwall
Shackelford
Shelby
Smith
Stephens
Sterling
Throckmorton
Titus
Upshur
Van Zandt
Victoria
Walker
Waller
Washington

Wise
Wood
Young

Utah 
2 out of 29 counties have adopted Second Amendment sanctuary (or other pro-Second Amendment) resolutions:

Uintah
Utah

Vermont 
0 out of 14 counties and 13 towns have adopted Second Amendment sanctuary (or other pro-Second Amendment) resolutions:

Arlington Town
Barre Town

Clarendon Town
Concord Town
Derby Town

Holland Town
Irasburg Town
Morgan Town

Pittsford Town
Poultney Town
Pownal Town
Searsburg Town
Stamford Town

Virginia 

91 out of 95 counties, 17 out of 38 independent cities, and 40 towns have adopted Second Amendment sanctuary (or other pro-Second Amendment) resolutions:

Accomack (plus Chincoteague Town and Parksley Town)
Alleghany (plus Clifton Forge Town)
Amelia
Amherst 
Appomattox
Augusta
Bath
Bedford (plus Bedford Town)
Bland
Botetourt
Bristol City
Brunswick
Buchanan
Buckingham
Buena Vista City
Campbell (plus Altavista Town)
Caroline (plus Bowling Green Town)
Carroll
Charlotte
Charles City County
Chesapeake City
Chesterfield
Clarke (plus Berryville Town)
Colonial Heights City
Covington City
Craig
Culpeper (plus Culpeper Town)
Cumberland
Dickenson
Dinwiddie
Essex (plus Tappahannock Town)
Fauquier
Floyd
Fluvanna
Franklin City
Franklin County (plus Rocky Mount Town)
Frederick
Galax City
Giles
Gloucester
Goochland
Grayson
Greene
Greensville
Halifax
Hanover

Henrico
Henry
Highland
Hopewell City
Isle of Wight
James City County
King and Queen
King George
King William
Lancaster (plus White Stone Town)
Lee
Louisa (plus Mineral Town)
Lovettsville Town
Lunenburg
Lynchburg City
Madison
Martinsville City
Mathews
Mecklenburg (plus Chase City Town)
Middlesex
Montgomery
Nelson
New Kent

Northampton (plus Exmore Town)
Northumberland
Norton City
Nottoway (plus Blackstone Town, Burkeville Town, and Crewe Town)
Orange
Page (plus Stanley Town)
Patrick
Pittsylvania
Poquoson City
Portsmouth City
Powhatan
Prince Edward
Prince George
Prince William
Pulaski (plus Pulaski Town)

Rappahannock
Richmond County (plus Warsaw Town)
Roanoke County (plus Vinton Town)
Rockbridge (plus Goshen Town)
Rockingham (plus Elkton Town and Grottoes Town)
Russell
Salem City
Scott
Scottsville Town
Shenandoah (plus Mount Jackson, New Market Town, Strasburg Town, and Woodstock Town)
Smyth (plus Chilhowie Town and Saltville Town)
Southampton
Spotsylvania
Stafford
Suffolk City
Surry (plus Claremont Town)
Sussex
Tazewell (plus Bluefield Town and Cedar Bluff Town)
Virginia Beach City
Warren (plus Front Royal Town)
Washington
Waynesboro City
Westmoreland
Wise (plus Appalachia Town, Big Stone Gap Town, and Wise Town)
Wythe (plus Rural Retreat Town)
York

On December 19, 2019, at the request of Del. Jerrauld C. Jones (D-Norfolk), state Attorney General Mark Herring issued an advisory opinion indicating the sanctuary resolutions were null and void. A press release quoted him as saying: “When the General Assembly passes new gun safety laws they will be enforced, and they will be followed. These resolutions have no legal force, and they're just part of an effort by the gun lobby to stoke fear”. Del. Todd Gilbert (R-Shenandoah) claimed that Herring's recent opinion contradicted his 2014 stance "regarding the supremacy of state law over the preferences of the officials who must enforce them". Gilbert was referring to Herring's refusal to defend Virginia's Marshall-Newman Amendment, a voter-approved constitutional provision that prohibited same-sex marriages.

West Virginia 
24 out of 55 counties, 3 cities, and 2 towns have adopted Second Amendment sanctuary (or other pro-Second Amendment) resolutions:

Boone
Cabell
Calhoun
Doddridge
Fayette
Harrison
Lewis
Logan (plus Logan City)
Marshall
McDowell
Mercer
Mineral (plus Keyser City)
Mingo (plus Kermit Town)
Monroe
Nicholas
Preston
Putnam

Randolph
St. Albans City

Tyler
Upshur
Wayne (plus Fort Gay Town)
Wirt
Wood
Wyoming (plus Oceana Town)

Wisconsin 
20 out of 72 counties and 1 city have adopted Second Amendment sanctuary (or other pro-Second Amendment) resolutions:

Dodge
Florence
Grant
Kenosha
Lafayette
Langlade

Marquette
Merrill City
Monroe
Oneida
Ozaukee
Polk
Portage
Rusk
Sawyer
Shawano

Vilas
Washburn
Washington
Waukesha
Wood

Local law enforcement resistance

Illinois 
Besides the Second Amendment Sanctuaries listed above by law, sheriffs of 25 counties and the police chief of 1 municipality listed below have vowed not to enforce any part of gun control legislation HB 5471 or the "Protect Illinois Communities Act" signed in 2023.

Carroll
Cass
DeKalb
DeWitt
DuPage
Fulton
Grundy
Jo Daviess
Kane
Kankakee
Kendall
Knox
Lee
Lincoln
Marshall
McHenry
McLean
Menard
Peoria
Putnam
Rock Island
Sangamon
St. Clair
Stephenson
Whiteside
Winnebago

Washington 

County sheriffs in 24 of the 39 counties and the police chief of one city have vowed to not enforce parts or all of the 2018 gun control ballot measure I-1639 while it is being challenged in court:

Adams
Benton
Chelan
Columbia
Cowlitz
Douglas
Ferry (plus Republic City)
Franklin
Garfield
Grant
Grays Harbor
Kittitas
Klickitat
Lewis
Lincoln
Mason
Okanogan
Pacific
Pend Oreille
Skamania
Spokane
Stevens
Wahkiakum
Washougal, a city in Clark County
Yakima

References

Gun politics in the United States
United States firearms law
2010s in the United States
2020s in the United States
2018 neologisms